Giovanni Cannata (born September 17, 1985 in Remscheid) is an Italian-German footballer who currently plays for SV Hüsten 09.

References

1985 births
Living people
Italian footballers
Bayer 04 Leverkusen II players
Rot-Weiss Essen players
Kickers Emden players
VfB Remscheid players
3. Liga players

Association football defenders